Goertzel algorithm - an algorithm used in digital signal processing
 Gerald Goertzel - author of the Goertzel algorithm
 Ben Goertzel - an American researcher in the field of artificial intelligence